United Nations Security Council Resolution 545 was adopted on 20 December 1983; after hearing representations from the People's Republic of Angola, the Council recalled resolutions 387 (1976), 428 (1978), 447 (1979), 454 (1979) and 475 (1980), and expressed its concern at the continuing attacks on the country by South Africa through occupied South West Africa.

The council demanded South Africa cease the attacks and respect Angola's sovereignty and territorial integrity, called upon South Africa to cease the occupation of southern Angola and withdraw its forces, and requested the Secretary-General continue to monitor the situation and report back to the Council as appropriate.

The resolution was approved by 14 votes to none, while the United States abstained.

See also
 List of United Nations Security Council Resolutions 501 to 600 (1982–1987)
 Namibian War of Independence
 South Africa Border Wars
 South Africa under apartheid

References
Text of the Resolution at undocs.org

External links
 

 0545
20th century in South Africa
1983 in Africa
 0545
Angola–South Africa relations
December 1983 events